The Gurvan Saikhan (lit. "three beauties"), is a mountain range in the Ömnögovi Province of southern Mongolia. It is named for three subranges: Baruun Saikhany Nuruu (the Western Beauty), Dund Saikhany Nuruu (the Middle Beauty) and Zuun Saikhany Nuruu (the Eastern Beauty).

A notable gorge, Yolyn Am, is found in Zuun Saikhany Nuruu. Though the range is surrounded by the Gobi desert, Yolyn Am contains a semi-permanent ice field.

The range forms the eastern part of the Gobi Gurvansaikhan National Park.

External links
Tourist map of Gobi Gurvansaikhan National Park

Altai Mountains
Mountain ranges of Mongolia